The PNE Roller Coaster is a wooden roller coaster at Playland in Vancouver, British Columbia, Canada. Opened in 1958, it is the oldest roller coaster in Canada. The coaster was awarded the Coaster Classic and Roller Coaster Landmark statuses by American Coaster Enthusiasts.

History
The Wooden Roller Coaster opened in 1958. At the time, it cost over $200,000 to make, and was 40 cents for guests to ride. Designed by Carl Phare and Walker LeRoy, the ride was the final design of Phare's career, and is his only creation that is still standing.

In film and television
The Coaster was featured in the 2004 horror movie Riding the Bullet and was the "Bullet". It also made a brief appearance in the 1996 teenage thriller Fear.

The Coaster was also featured in the background of the MacGyver episode “Brainwashed”

Awards

References

External links